Dmitri Georgievich Kitayenko (also spelled Dmitrij Kitajenko) (born 18 August 1940) is a Soviet and Russian conductor. He was bestowed the title People's Artist of the USSR (1984).

He was born in Leningrad, Soviet Union and studied at the Glinka Conservatory and those of Leningrad and Moscow. He was a prizewinner in the first Herbert von Karajan competition in 1969.

Kitayenko was music director of the Moscow Philharmonic Orchestra for 14 years. He has also held principal conductorships with the Bergen Philharmonic Orchestra (1990–1998), the Frankfurt Radio Symphony Orchestra (1990–1996),
the American Russian Young Artists Orchestra, KBS Symphony Orchestra (1999–2004), and the Bern Symphony Orchestra (1990–2004). He has also served as principal conductor of the Stanislavski and Nemirovich-Danchenko Moscow Academic Music Theatre (1970–1976).

References

External links
Homepage of Dmitri Kitayenko

Soviet conductors (music)
Musicians from Saint Petersburg
1940 births
Living people
Moscow Conservatory alumni
21st-century Russian conductors (music)
Russian male conductors (music)
21st-century Russian male musicians